The bighead pupfish (Cyprinodon pachycephalus), known in Spanish as  cachorrito cabezon, is a critically endangered species of pupfish in the family Cyprinodontidae.

See also
 Cyprinodon julimes – a related pupfish that also lives in hot springs in Mexico

References

Cyprinodon
Endemic fish of Mexico
Freshwater fish of Mexico
Critically endangered fish
Critically endangered biota of Mexico
Critically endangered fauna of North America
Taxa named by Wendell L. Minckley
Taxa named by Charles Olin Minckley
Fish described in 1986
Taxonomy articles created by Polbot